Top Country Albums is a chart that ranks the top-performing country music albums in the United States, published by Billboard.  In 1985, 14 different albums topped the chart, based on sales reports submitted by a representative sample of stores nationwide.

In the issue of Billboard dated January 5, the band Exile was at number one with the album Kentucky Hearts, its third week in the top spot.  Two weeks later it was replaced by Does Fort Worth Ever Cross Your Mind by George Strait, who was the only act with more than one number one during the year; he returned to the peak position in December with Something Special.  The band Alabama's album 40-Hour Week had both the longest unbroken run at number one and the highest total number of weeks in the top spot; it spent 12 consecutive weeks atop the chart from March to June and then returned to the top spot for two further weeks in August.  In March Ray Charles achieved his first number-one country album with Friendship.  Although he was far more associated with the soul and rhythm and blues genres during his lengthy career, Charles had several entries on the country albums chart in the mid-1980s, including Friendship, on which he duetted with a range of contemporary country singers.

Several other acts reached number one for the first time in 1985, beginning with the Judds, who topped the chart in February with their second chart entry, Why Not Me.  The pair would go on to be one of the most successful country acts of the 1980s before Naomi Judd, the elder member of the mother-daughter duo, was forced to retire due to a serious illness.  The Judds were among a number of 1985's chart-topping acts, along with George Strait and Ricky Skaggs, to be identified with the neotraditional country trend, which moved away from the pop music-influenced style which had dominated the country charts in the earlier part of the decade in favour of a sound closer to the genre's roots.  In October the Statler Brothers, who had first entered the chart in 1966, spent the only week of their career at number one when the album Pardners in Rhyme reached the top spot for a single week. In December, Gary Morris likewise spent his only week atop the chart with Anything Goes.  It was displaced by the year's final number one, The Heart of the Matter by Kenny Rogers, in the issue of Billboard dated December 28.  Rogers' album would go on to spend a total of six weeks at number one but would prove to be the last of the 11 chart-toppers which the singer achieved in his lifetime; he would top the chart again in 2020 shortly after his death.

Chart history

References

1985
1985 record charts